Robert S. Nevil (born October 2, 1958) is an American pop singer, songwriter, producer, and guitarist who had five Billboard top 40 hits including his songs "C'est la Vie" (#2, 1986), "Dominoes" (#14, 1987), and "Wot's It to Ya" (#10, 1987).

Life and career
Nevil began playing guitar at age 11 and played in a series of cover bands. He began performing his original music and signed a publishing deal in 1983, writing songs for the Pointer Sisters, El DeBarge, Alison Moyet, and Earth, Wind & Fire.

In 1986, he obtained his first recording contract, signing with Manhattan Records, for whom he recorded his debut album with the producers Alex Sadkin and Phil Thornalley. His debut single "C'est la Vie" reached #2 on the Billboard Hot 100, propelling the album into the top 40 on both the US pop and Billboard R&B chart. His second single "Dominoes" hit #14 on the Hot 100 and #22 on the Hot Dance Music/Club Play chart, while the third single "Wot's It to Ya" peaked at #10 on the Hot 100 and Dance Club/Play charts, and #69 on the R&B chart. He sang backup on Stevie Nicks' version of "Silent Night" for the holiday compilation, A Very Special Christmas.

Nevil's second album was released in 1988; however, it did not match the success of his debut album. A Place Like This (#118) spawned the top 40 moderate hit "Back on Holiday" (#34), and a second single, "Somebody Like You", became a minor hit, peaking at #63.

In 1991, Nevil's third album, Day 1, was released to fewer sales. The lead single "Just Like You" became his biggest hit since his debut album, and his fifth and final top 40 single, peaking at #25 on the Hot 100. Second single "For Your Mind" peaked at #86, ending his chart run in the US.

Nevil turned to writing and producing for other acts such as Babyface, Jessica Simpson, Destiny's Child, and Japanese pop singer Seiko Matsuda. In 2006, he collaborated with Matthew Gerrard on the Smash Mouth album Summer Girl. Gerrard had been writing for Disney for some time and their work led to a partnership working on Disney projects including The Cheetah Girls, High School Musical, and Hannah Montana franchises. Nevil shared ASCAP Awards for his work on High School Musical and Hannah Montana in 2008, 2009, and 2010.

From 2011 on, Nevil has been creating, writing, and producing music for Extreme Music, part of Sony/ATV Music Publishing. Several of his Extreme Music compositions appear on the 2015 Sony compilation album Party Pop.

Nevil is married with two children. He is the older brother of actor Alex Nevil.

Discography

Studio albums

Compilation albums
 The Best of Robbie Nevil (1998)
 Wot's It to Ya: The Best of Robbie Nevil (1999)
 Party Pop (2015)

Singles

See also
List of number-one dance hits (United States)
List of artists who reached number one on the U.S. dance chart

Notes

References

External links

[ Allmusic]
Official website

1958 births
Living people
American dance musicians
American male singers
American male songwriters
Songwriters from California
Singers from Los Angeles